"Two More Years" is a single by Bloc Party. It reached number 7 in the UK Singles Chart, making it the second of the band's top ten hits.

Track listing 

All lyrics by Kele Okereke (except where noted). All music composed by Bloc Party (Kele Okereke, Russell Lissack, Gordon Moakes & Matt Tong). All tracks produced by Paul Epworth and Bloc Party.

7": Wichita / WEBB095S (UK) 
 "Two More Years"
 "Hero"

The UK 7" was pressed onto green vinyl.

CD: Wichita / WEBB95SCD (UK) 
 "Two More Years" (4:28)
 "Banquet" (The Streets Mix) (3:47) (lyrics by Mike Skinner & Kele Okereke)

CD: Wichita / WEBB95SCDX (UK) 
 "Two More Years" (4:28)
 "Hero" (4:08)
 "Two More Years" (video)
 "Banquet" (The Streets Mix - video) (lyrics by Mike Skinner & Kele Okereke)

Charts

Weekly charts

Year-end charts

Other appearances
The Saturday Sessions: The Dermot O'Leary Show (2007, EMI)

References

2005 singles
Bloc Party songs
Song recordings produced by Paul Epworth
2005 songs
Wichita Recordings singles
Songs written by Kele Okereke
Songs written by Gordon Moakes
Songs written by Russell Lissack
Songs written by Matt Tong
UK Independent Singles Chart number-one singles